Ahmad Madani (July/August 1929 – 12 February 2006) was an Iranian politician, Commander of Iranian Navy (1979), governor of the Khuzestan province (1979–80) and candidate in the first Iranian presidential election. Madani became a navy Commodore in 1970, but was removed in 1973. He later became a navy commander after the revolution and was the first ever Minister of Defence under the new regime. Madani was also elected to the first parliament from Kerman, but was not approved. He eventually fled to the United States in 1980.

Pre-Revolution
Ahmad Madani was born in 1929 in Tehran.

He grew up in Kerman before returning to Tehran to pursue university education. Madani studied law at the University of Tehran, before joining the Iranian Navy and moving to England  to continue his education. In 1953, Madani reached the rank of Ensign in the navy, and in 1970 he reached the rank of Commodore.

Madani spent most of his service in Bandar Abbas and the Persian Gulf. He was dismissed from the navy in 1973 for his political activities, and until the 1979 revolution he taught political science and economics throughout various universities in Iran.

Electoral history

Exile and death
In 1980, Madani discovered that he was accused of communicating with the United States, and thus fled the country. Madani settled in the United States where he was the chairman of the National Front outside of Iran.

Madani died on 12 February 2006 due to cancer, in his home in Colorado.

References

External links

20th-century Iranian politicians
1929 births
2006 deaths
Candidates in the 1980 Iranian presidential election
Commanders of Islamic Republic of Iran Navy
Defence ministers of Iran
Exiles of the Iranian Revolution in the United States
Iranian elected officials who did not take office
Iranian emigrants to the United States
Iranian governors
National Front (Iran) politicians
People from Kerman Province
Deaths from cancer in Colorado